Wadham College Boat Club (WCBC) is the rowing club of Wadham College, Oxford, in Oxford, United Kingdom. The club's members are students and staff from Wadham College and Harris Manchester College. Founded sometime before 1837, Wadham has had success both within Oxford and externally in regattas such as Henley Royal Regatta.

The boat club is based in its boathouse on the Isis, which is shared with St Anne's College Boat Club and St Hugh's College Boat Club as well as in Godstow.

History
The first official record of the boat club’s existence appeared in 1837 when the club was officially constituted. The Wadham 1st Eight competed in the first ever race of the Grand Challenge Cup at Henley Royal Regatta in 1839, and narrowly lost to Trinity College, Cambridge. This defeat would be avenged in the next decade when, in 1849, Wadham raced Trinity, Cambridge and Oriel College in the Ladies' Challenge Plate and the Grand Challenge Cup on successive days. Wadham won both races with Trinity as the runner-up and Oriel in a distant third. 
It is from this defeat of Trinity that Wadham claimed its traditional right to wear Cambridge Blue as its boating colours, and to this day the 1st Eight Blazers and Ties continue this tradition. 

By 1897 Wadham College had emulated the example of the rest of the colleges and invested in a permanent Wadham Barge to serve as a rowing base on the Isis. 
A new boathouse was built in 1989 and is now shared with St. Anne's and St. Hugh's colleges.

The year 1974 saw the first admission of women to the College, and in 1975 a women’s team was officially created. The first year of the women’s club was extraordinarily successful, and the women dominated the university by winning the Christ Church Regatta and the Lady Margaret Hall Regatta. In 1976 a women’s division was added to the Summer Eights schedule, and following a random draw which placed the Wadham women at 3rd on the river they immediately bumped up to second and first on successive days, and then rowed over on the Friday and Saturday to claim the first Women’s Head of the River.

Recent form

In recent years the Women of Wadham have achieved great successes in and out of Oxford rowing.  Within college rowing the women won the Eights headship in 2014 after bumping St John's College, and also gained the Torpids headship in 2015.  W2 remains the highest second boat on the river, and currently enjoys a strong position in Division III alongside other colleges' first boats. External successes include W1 racing at Women's Henley in 2014, and a number of other external races where W1 has raced and defeated university first boats.

Membership

Membership in the boat club is open to all students and staff of Wadham College and Harris Manchester College.

Equipment

Fleet
Men's boats
2022 Filippi 8+ "Spirit of Niccolo"
2018 Salani 8+ "Sir Ralph Walker"
2016 Filippi 4+ "Paul Bowen"
2014 Filippi 8+ "Kristanne Claire"
1996 Janousek 8+ "Spirit of Nelson"

Women's boats
2022 Filippi 8+ TBN
2018 Salani 8+ "Spirit of 76"
2016 Filippi 4+ "Alpha Lau"
2014 Filippi 8+ "Rod Andrews"
1997 Janousek 8+ "Mary Margherita"
1992 Janousek 8+ "Sir Claus Moser"

Small boats
2017 Falcon 1x "Vere Ducker"
2016 Falcon 1x "Dorothy"
Pre 1994 Aylings 2x/2- "John Fleming"
Pre 1994 Janousek 1x "Harry Fawcett"
Pre 1994 Janousek 1x "Ben Arber"

Ergometer room
The boat club has a dedicated ergometer room in Wadham College with 8 concept2 ergometers and 2 RowPerfect indoor rowers.

Training locations
The bulk of novice and lower boat water training occurs on the Isis out of Wadham's boathouse. The Senior squads typically train with their top two boats on the Godstow stretch of the Thames near the Trout Inn.

Social life

Wadham rowers enjoy a varied and exciting social life within the club.

Notable Wadham rowers

Honours

Henley Royal Regatta

References

External links

Wadham College Boat Club
Oxford University Rowing Clubs
A General History of Oxford College Rowing

Rowing clubs of the University of Oxford
Wadham College, Oxford
Sports clubs established in 1837
1837 establishments in England
Rowing clubs in Oxfordshire
Rowing clubs of the River Thames